Feijoal is a village on the island of Fogo, Cape Verde. It lies close to the town Mosteiros, at about 220 meters elevation. Its population was 435 at the 2010 census. The main festival in the settlement is Saint Anthony which is on June 13.

See also
List of villages and settlements in Cape Verde

References

Mosteiros, Cape Verde
Villages and settlements in Fogo, Cape Verde